Josephine Asperup (born 21 July 1992) is a Danish ice hockey player and member of the Danish national ice hockey team, currently playing as a centre with the Malmö Redhawks Dam of the Swedish Damettan.

She has represented Denmark as a defenseman at ten IIHF Women's World Championships, including at the Top Division tournament of the 2021 IIHF Women's World Championship.

Personal life 
Asperup's younger brother, Matthias, is also an ice hockey player – a winger – and represented  at the Top Division tournament of the 2021 IIHF World Championship.

Career statistics

Regular season and playoffs

International

References

External links 
 

Living people
1992 births
People from Gladsaxe Municipality
Danish women's ice hockey defencemen
Danish women's ice hockey forwards
Luleå HF/MSSK players
Djurgårdens IF Hockey Dam players
Linköping HC Dam players
AIK Hockey Dam players
Danish expatriate ice hockey people
Danish expatriate sportspeople in Sweden
Expatriate ice hockey players in Sweden
Ice hockey players at the 2022 Winter Olympics
Olympic ice hockey players of Denmark
Sportspeople from the Capital Region of Denmark
European Women's Hockey League players